Decma is a genus of Asian bush crickets belonging to the tribe Meconematini: in the subfamily Meconematinae.

Species 
The Orthoptera Species File lists the following species, found in Indochina southern China and Malesia:
Subgenus Decma Gorochov, 1993
 Decma bolivari (Karny, 1924)
 Decma brachyptera Chang, Du & Shi, 2013
 Decma fissa (Xia & Liu, 1992)
 Decma inversa (Karny, 1907)
 Decma lindu Gorochov, 2012
 Decma minahassa Gorochov, 2012
 Decma miramae Gorochov, 1993
 Decma orlovi Gorochov, 2004
 Decma predtetshenskyi Gorochov, 1993
 Decma stshelkanovtzevi Gorochov, 1993 - type species, locality Đà Bắc District, Hoa Binh, Vietnam
 Decma sulawesi Gorochov, 2012
 Decma thai Gorochov, 1998
 Decma tristis Gorochov & Kang, 2005
Subgenus Idiodecma Gorochov, 1993
 Decma birmanica (Bey-Bienko, 1971)
 Decma improvisum Gorochov & Kostia, 1993
 Decma nigrovertex Liu, 2004
Subgenus Neodecma Gorochov, 2004
 Decma elefani Gorochov, 2004
Subgenus Paradecma Liu & Zhou, 2007
 Decma bispinosa Liu & Zhou, 2007
Subgenus not assigned' Decma abruptum'' Gorochov, 2012

References 

Meconematinae
Tettigoniidae genera
Orthoptera of Asia